Tania Isabel Madriaga Flores (born 23 February 1972) is a Chilean politician and sociologist that is current member of the Chilean Constitutional Convention.

She is a collaborator of Jorge Sharp, Major of Valparaíso.

After the false cancer of Rodrigo Rojas Vade, she assumed as Vice-President of the Convention. Nevertheless, she decided to resign two days later.

Biography
Madariaga was born in 1972 in the «Nueva Habana» land seizure in Santiago de Chile. In 1979, when she was 7, Madariaga went into exile and arrived in the city of Antwerp in Belgium for then arriving in Havana, Cuba. In 1986, she returned to Chile and has lived in Valparaíso since 2017.

He studied sociology at the University of Concepción and obtained a master's degree in social sciences at the University of Chile.

Political career
Since 2017, she has collaborated with the mayor of Valparaíso, Jorge Sharp, working as director of the Communal Planning Secretariat. Like the communal chief, she was a member of the Autonomist Movement and Convergencia Social, last party from which she resigned in November 2019.

References

External links
 
 
 BCN Profile

1972 births
Living people
Chilean people
Chilean sociologists
University of Concepción alumni
University of Chile alumni
21st-century Chilean politicians
Members of the Autonomist Movement
Social Convergence politicians
Members of the List of the People
Members of the Chilean Constitutional Convention